The 1876–77 United States Senate elections were held on various dates in various states, coinciding with Rutherford B. Hayes's narrow election as president. As these U.S. Senate elections were prior to the ratification of the Seventeenth Amendment in 1913, senators were chosen by state legislatures. Senators were elected over a wide range of time throughout 1876 and 1877, and a seat may have been filled months late or remained vacant due to legislative deadlock. In these elections, terms were up for the senators in Class 2.

Although the Republican Party maintained their Senate majority, the Democratic Party gained five seats.

Results summary 
Senate party division, 45th Congress (1877–1879)

 Majority party: Republican (39)
 Minority party: Democratic (35)
 Other parties: Anti-Monopoly (1), Independent (1)
 Total seats: 76

Change in Senate composition

Before the elections 
After the November 15, 1876 elections in the new state of Colorado.

After the elections

Race summaries

Special elections during the 44th Congress 
In these elections, the winners were seated during 1876 or in 1877 before March 4; ordered by election date.

Races leading to the 45th Congress 

In these regular elections, the winners were elected for the term beginning March 4, 1877; ordered by state.

All of the elections involved the Class 2 seats.

Elections during the 45th Congress 
In these elections, the winners were elected in 1877 after March 4.

Alabama

Arkansas

Colorado

Colorado (initial, class 2)

Colorado (initial, class 3)

Colorado (regular)

Connecticut (special)

Delaware

Georgia

Illinois

Iowa

Kansas

Kentucky

Louisiana

Louisiana (special)

Louisiana (regular)

Maine

Maine (regular)

Maine (special)

Massachusetts

Michigan

Minnesota

Mississippi

Nebraska

New Hampshire

New Jersey

North Carolina

Ohio (special)

Oregon

Pennsylvania (special) 
The special election in Pennsylvania was held March 20, 1877.

Republican Senator Simon Cameron had been elected to the United States Senate by the Pennsylvania General Assembly, consisting of the House of Representatives and the Senate, in 1867 and was re-elected in 1873. Sen. Cameron resigned on March 12, 1877.

Following the resignation of Simon Cameron, the Pennsylvania General Assembly convened on March 20, 1877, to elect a new Senator to fill the vacancy. Former United States Secretary of War J. Donald Cameron, Simon Cameron's son, was elected to complete his father's term, set to expire on March 4, 1879. The results of the vote of both houses combined are as follows:

|-
|-bgcolor="#EEEEEE"
| colspan="3" align="right" | Totals
| align="right" | 251
| align="right" | 100.00%
|}

Rhode Island

South Carolina

Tennessee

Tennessee (regular)

Tennessee (special)

Texas

Virginia

West Virginia

West Virginia (special) 

First-term Democrat Allen T. Caperton died July 26, 1876, in his second year in office. Fellow-Democrat Samuel Price was appointed August 26, 1876 to continue the term, pending a special election in which he was a candidate. Price lost the election to Democratic congressman Frank Hereford January 26, 1877 on the 5th ballot.

Hereford resigned from the House January 31, 1877, thereby qualifying for the Senate.  He only finished the term and left office in 1881.

West Virginia (regular) 

First-term Democrat Henry G. Davis was re-elected January 26, 1877 on the fourth ballot.

Davis would retire after this second term, in 1883.

See also 
 1876 United States elections
 1876 United States presidential election
 1876–77 United States House of Representatives elections
 44th United States Congress
 45th United States Congress

Notes

References

Further reading 
 Party Division in the Senate, 1789-Present, via Senate.gov
 Pennsylvania Election Statistics: 1682-2006 from the Wilkes University Election Statistics Project